
Gmina Branice is a rural gmina (administrative district) in Głubczyce County, Opole Voivodeship, in south-western Poland, on the Czech border.

Geography
Gmina Branice is on the Głubczyce Plateau (a part of the Silesian Lowlands) and partly in the Opawskie Mountains (a part of the Eastern Sudeten). Gmina Branice is located in the Oder River Basin (rivers: Opawa, Troja).

Villages
Gmina Branice contains the villages and settlements of Bliszczyce, Boboluszki, Branice, Dzbańce, Dzbańce-Osiedle, Dzierżkowice, Gródczany, Jabłonka, Jakubowice, Jędrychowice, Lewice, Michałkowice, Niekazanice, Posucice, Turków, Uciechowice, Włodzienin, Wódka and Wysoka.

Neighbouring gminas
Gmina Branice is bordered by the gminas of Głubczyce and Kietrz. It also borders Czech Republic (towns of Krnov, Úvalno, Brumovice, Holasovice and Opava).

References

Branice
Głubczyce County